Petronella "Nel" Johanna Marie Kluitman (1879-1961) was a Dutch artist.

Biography 
Kluitman was born on 3 October 1879 in Alkmaar. Her work was included in the 1939 exhibition and sale Onze Kunst van Heden (Our Art of Today) at the Rijksmuseum in Amsterdam. Kluitman died on 3 June 1990 in Hilversum.

References

External links
images of Kluitman's work on Simonis & Buunk
images of Kluitman's work on ArtNet

1906 births
1990 deaths
People from Alkmaar
20th-century Dutch women artists